This is a list of compositions by Jake Heggie sorted by genre, date of composition, and title.

External links
 Official website of Jake Heggie

Lists of compositions by composer